Stipa speciosa (syn. Achnatherum speciosum is a species of grass known by the common name desert needlegrass. It is native to much of the south-western United States from California to Colorado, where it grows in dry areas, especially sagebrush habitat. It is also known from Mexico and parts of South America.

Description
This is a short perennial bunchgrass reaching a maximum height of 1–2 ft. The leaf blades are less than a millimeter wide and rolled along the edges. The bases are stiff and remain as the dense grass clump dries. The inflorescence is up to about 2 inches long and is dense and fluffy. Each spikelet is very hairy and has a bent awn up to about a centimeter long which is coated in long hairs.

The stiff awn and the sharp tip of the spikelet make the seeds hazardous for animals. The hairs on the seed help in catch in animal coats and drift on the wind for dispersal. The awn also twists when wet, helping the seed bury itself in the soil.

References

External links
Jepson Manual Treatment — Achnatherum speciosum
USDA Plants Profile — Achnatherum speciosum (desert needlegrass)
Grass Manual Treatment: Achnatherum speciosum
US Forest Service: Ecology
 University of Michigan - Dearborn: Native American Ethnobotany 
Achnatherum speciosum — U.C. Photo gallery

speciosa
Bunchgrasses of North America
Bunchgrasses of South America
Grasses of the United States
Grasses of Mexico
Native grasses of California
Flora of Central Mexico
Flora of Northwestern Mexico
Flora of the Southwestern United States
North American desert flora
Flora of the California desert regions
Flora of the Sonoran Deserts
Flora of the Great Basin
Natural history of the Mojave Desert
Flora of California
Flora of the Sierra Nevada (United States)
Flora of Baja California
Flora of Oregon
Flora of New Mexico
Flora of South America
Plants used in Native American cuisine
Flora without expected TNC conservation status